Sam Bowen may refer to:
Sam Bowen (baseball) (born 1952), American baseball player
Sam Bowen (boxer) (born 1992), British boxer
Sam Bowen (footballer) (born 2001), Welsh footballer
Sam Bowens (1938 – 2003), American baseball player
Teddy Bowen (Samuel Edward Bowen, 1903–1981), English footballer